"Just What I Do" is a song recorded by American country music group Trick Pony.  It was released in January 2002 as the third single from their debut album Trick Pony.  The song was written by group members Keith Burns and Ira Dean, with Burns taking lead vocals.

The song was nominated for a 2003 Grammy Award for Best Country Performance by a Duo or Group with Vocal. It was also nominated for Single Record of the Year at the 2003 Academy of Country Music awards while the video was nominated for Music Video of the Year.

Music video
The music video was directed by Peter Zavadil and premiered in April 2002.

Chart performance
"Just What I Do" debuted at number 55 on the U.S. Billboard Hot Country Singles & Tracks chart for the week of January 19, 2002.

Year-end charts

References

2002 singles
2001 songs
Trick Pony songs
Warner Records singles
Music videos directed by Peter Zavadil